Captain Alexander Steven Bilsland, 1st Baron Bilsland, KT, MC (13 September 1892 – 10 December 1970), known as Sir Steven Bilsland, Bt, between 1921 and 1950, was a Scottish businessman and public servant.

Life

Bilsland was the eldest surviving son of Sir William Bilsland, 1st Baronet, Lord Provost of Glasgow, and his wife, Agnes Anne Steven, daughter of Alexander Steven, of Provanside, Glasgow. He was the brother-in-law of Lord Clydesmuir. He was educated at St John's College, Cambridge. He was head of Bilsland Brothers Ltd, bakers, of Glasgow, founded by his uncle James Bilsland. He was also chairman of the Scottish National Trust Ltd. Bilsland succeeded his father in the baronetcy in 1921. In November 1938 he was appointed  Honorary Colonel of the newly formed 8th Battalion Cameronians (Scottish Rifles) (57th Searchlight Regiment) (having previously served as a captain in the old 8th Battalion). In 1950 he was elevated to the peerage as Baron Bilsland, of Kinrara in the County of Inverness, in recognition of his "...public services in Scotland". He was further honoured in 1955 when he was made a Knight of the Thistle.

Lord Bilsland married Amy Janet Colville, daughter of David Colville JP, of Jerviston House, Motherwell, Lanarkshire, in 1922. They had no children. He died in December 1970, aged 78, when the baronetcy and barony became extinct.

Arms

References

External links

1892 births
1970 deaths
Alumni of St John's College, Cambridge
Knights of the Thistle
Recipients of the Military Cross
Scottish bankers
Barons created by George VI
20th-century Scottish businesspeople